Parliamentary elections were held in Kosovo on 11 June 2017.

Background
The elections were triggered by a motion of no confidence in the government of Prime Minister Isa Mustafa on 10 May 2017 by a vote of 78–34. The motion had been proposed by the Social Democratic Initiative over government failures to meet their campaign promises. The constitution requires fresh elections to be held by 18 June 2017.

Electoral system
The 120 members of the Assembly are elected by open list proportional representation, with 20 seats reserved for national minorities.

Parties and coalitions

Opinion polls

Results

Aftermath
No party obtained enough seats to form government alone. However, PDK coalition leader Ramush Haradinaj stated that he has the necessary votes to form a government, counting on the 39 seats of his coalition, the 20 seats of the ethnic minorities and some members of the LDK coalition.

After several unsuccessful attempts to elect a new Chairman of the Assembly and a new Prime Minister, on 4 August Behgjet Pacolli announced the AKR's withdrawal from the coalition with the LDK and the formation of a government pact with the PAN Coalition. As a result, the AKR was promised several ministries in the new government, including the Ministry of Foreign Affairs, the Ministry of Interior, the Ministry of Land Management, the Ministry of Agriculture and the Ministry of Economic Development. The PAN Coalition announced that two LDK deputies, Ukë Rugova and Dardan Gashi, would also join the government.

Finally on September 9 the new government was voted, and Ramush Haradinaj was elected new prime minister with 61 votes in favor. This votes include Ramush Haradinaj  pre-election coalition PANA Coalition, AKR, the national minorities and the Serbian list. The new government include 21 ministers includes ethnic Albanians, Bosniaks, Turks and Serbs.

References

Kosovo
2017 in Kosovo
Elections in Kosovo
June 2017 events in Europe